Iiris is a Finnish and Estonian female given name. 
Iiris is a version of the international name Iris.

People
 Iiris Vesik (born 1991), Estonian singer
 Iiris Suomela (born 1994), Finnish politician

See also
 Iris (disambiguation)

References

Finnish feminine given names
Estonian feminine given names